The Roman Catholic Diocese of Jalpaiguri is a diocese located in the city of Jalpaiguri in the Ecclesiastical province of Calcutta in India.

History
 17 January 1952: Established as the Diocese of Jalpaiguri from the Diocese of Dinajpur

Leadership
 Bishops of Jalpaiguri (Latin Rite)
 Bishop Clement Tirkey (31 January 2006 – present)
 Bishop James Anthony Toppo (24 April 1971 – 4 May 2004)
 Bishop Francis Ekka (29 November 1967 – 24 April 1971)
 Bishop Ambrose Galbiati, P.I.M.E. (20 March 1952 – 22 March 1967)

References

External links
 GCatholic.org 
 Catholic Hierarchy 

Roman Catholic dioceses in India
Christianity in West Bengal
Christian organizations established in 1952
Roman Catholic dioceses and prelatures established in the 20th century
1952 establishments in West Bengal
Jalpaiguri